Mary Hill Convent is a convent in Karnataka. It was affected by the attacks on Christians in southern Karnataka in September 2008.

Buildings and structures in Mangalore